The 1945–46 Panhellenic Championship was the 12th season of the highest football league of Greece and the first after the WW2. The clubs that participated were the champions from the three founding football associations of the HFF: Athens, Piraeus and Macedonia.

The championship was won by Aris for their 3rd title. Initially, with the completion of all 6 matches, Aris held the first place in the standings. But then the HFF accepted the objections of his opponents for illegal use of the player Siotis (which he played in two clubs at the same season), awarding 2–0 in their favor, the last 3 of his 4 games (an away draw against AEK Athens and home wins against Olympiacos and AEK), while at the same time zeroed the club of Thessaloniki for those games. For a few days, the ranking was formed with the declaration of the AEK as champion by the HFF and Aris bringing the issue to its general assembly. In the end, Aris was vindicated in the appeal and won the title. The point system was: Win: 3 points - Draw: 2 points - Loss: 1 point.

Qualification round

Athens Football Clubs Association

 a.  The ranking was formed based on the goal ratio.

The championship was interrupted when on 19 May 1946 without the completion of the 15th matchday, while the replay matches were also postponed. The HFF declared the champions of Athens, Piraeus and Macedonia the first clubs of the standings, in order to participate in the Panhellenic championship.

Piraeus Football Clubs Association

 a.  The ranking was formed based on the goal ratio.
 b.  Olympiacos and Argonaftis had 1 match less but since the first and the last place had been decided, the match was canceled in order for the Panhellenic championship to start on time.

Macedonia Football Clubs Association

Final round

League table

Matches

Top scorers

References

External links
Rsssf, 1945-46 championship

Panhellenic Championship seasons
Greece
Panhellenic Championship